is a Japanese manga series written by Tensei Hagiwara and illustrated by Tomoki Miyoshi and Yoshiaki Seto. It is a spin-off of the main series Kaiji by Nobuyuki Fukumoto. The manga has been serialized in Kodansha's seinen manga magazine Morning since January 2021.

Publication
Jōkyō Seikatsuroku Ichijō, written by Tensei Hagiwara and illustrated by Tomoki Miyoshi and Yoshiaki Seto, started in Kodansha's seinen manga magazine Morning on January 21, 2021. Kodansha has collected its chapters into individual tankōbon volumes. The first volume was released on July 20, 2021. As of October 6, 2022, five volumes have been released.

Volume list

References

External links
 
 

Comics spin-offs
Kaiji (manga)
Kodansha manga
Nobuyuki Fukumoto
Prequel comics
Seinen manga